The Ba–Shu scripts are three undeciphered scripts found on bronzeware from the states of Ba and Shu in the Sichuan Basin of southwestern China in the 5th and 4th centuries BC. Numerous signature seals have been found in Ba–Shu graves, suggesting that the states used written records, though none have been found. The known inscriptions are too few to be deciphered, or even to identify the language recorded.

Scripts 
The first script consists of pictographic symbols decorating weapons found in Ba graves in eastern Sichuan.
About two hundred individual symbols have been identified. The most common depict human faces, hands and figures, tigers, turtles, dragons, flowers, birds and cicadas. There are also some abstract forms.
The longest inscription, on a lacquer tray found near Changsha, Hunan, consists of 11 symbols.

The second script is found in both western and eastern Sichuan, on five halberd blades, a belt buckle and the base of a bronze vessel. Some scholars believe this script to be phonetic, pointing to similarities between some of the symbols and symbols of the later Yi script.
Except for one symbol resembling the Chinese character 王 ("king"), the symbols cannot be connected with Chinese characters, or with the earlier pictographic script.

The third script is known from a single sample, an inscription on the lid of a bronze vessel found in a grave in Baihuatan, Chengdu dating from c. 476 BC.  It may also be phonetic.

Gallery
 Scripts

 Artefacts

See also 
 Ba–Shu Chinese
 Bashu culture
 Sichuanese people

References 

Works cited

Further reading

External links 
 Rhinoceros-form Ba–Shu seal, Christies sale 2509, lot 899.
 Ram-form Ba–Shu seal, Christies sale 2509, lot 898.
 Square Ba–Shu seal
 Tiger-form Ba–Shu seal, City University of Hong Kong.

Culture in Sichuan
History of Sichuan
Undeciphered writing systems
Shu (state)